Calling Darkness is a horror comedy podcast written by Gemma Amor and S.H.Cooper. It was co-created by S.H.Cooper, Gemma Amor, Victoria Juan, Allison Brandt, Desdymona Howard, and Charlotte Norup who each play characters in an ensemble cast. It is narrated by Kate Siegel; the first season was released in 2019 and comprised ten episodes. The second season was released in 2023.

Premise
Four women go to Crowe House, an isolated manor, for acting lessons from Annabelle Crowe. They are joined by Annabelle's visiting cousin, Nadia. The group read a book which accidentally summons a demon. They try to escape Crowe House and defeat the demon with help from a priest and his friend.

Cast
Kate Siegel as the narrator
S.H.Cooper as Bridgette Milsen
Gemma Amor as Gloria Smith
Victoria Juan as Mariela Williams
Allison Brandt as Cassie Waters
Desdymona Howard as Annabelle Crowe
Charlotte Norup as Nadia Olsen
Erin B Lillis as Mrs. Morwood
David Cummings as Mr. Morwood
Dan Zappulla as Phineas Daws
Owen McCuen as Father Montgomery
Graham Rowat as the demon

List of episodes

Season 1

Development
The concept was developed by Gemma Amor, Allison Brandt, S.H.Cooper, Desdymona Howard, Victoria Juan, and Charlotte Norup who wanted to get into voice acting. Amor and Cooper decided to write the show while all six would feature as actors. Both writers had contributed to The NoSleep Podcast and approached David Cummings for advice on how to produce the show. Cummings became an Executive Producer, and helped involve Kate Siegel. Teaser episodes were released in 2018 and the first season followed 2019; Amor and Cooper had planned to write and release the second season in 2020, but it was delayed by the Covid-19 pandemic.

Reception
By October 2020, the podcast had reached 200,000 downloads. Writing for The A.V. Club, Elena Fernández-Collins observed that the show's "sharp, integral focus on character relationships, mostly in the ways that they hate each other, that allows for humorous moments even when someone is being dragged to their doom". Writing about the first episode, Crescenda Long also praised the dark humour. A review by Elle Turpitt in Divination Hollow – which publishes reviews of horror, sci-fi, and fantasy – was positive about the podcast and highlighted the balance of the ensemble cast and the characters' development.

Awards

References

External links

Audio podcasts
2019 podcast debuts
Horror podcasts